Syncopacma thaumalea is a moth of the family Gelechiidae. It is found on the Canary Islands and in North Africa.

The wingspan is 8–9 mm. The forewings are shining copper-brown. The hindwings are whitish grey.

The larvae feed on Astragalus gombo. They live in a silken tube, covered with sand. This tube runs from the ground up to the lowest leaves. Here, the feeding causes fleck mines. The larvae are greenish-white with a brown head.

References

Moths described in 1905
Syncopacma